The territorial waters of Indonesia are defined according to the principles set out in Article 46 of the United Nations Convention on the Law of the Sea.  Their boundary consists of straight lines ("baselines") linking 195 coordinate points located at the outer edge of the archipelago ("basepoints").

Baselines legislation
The current baselines were established by Government Regulation 38 of 2002 which defined by 183 coordinate points as basepoints. The baselines were modified by Government Regulation No 37 of 2008 which changed as well as added basepoints to take into account the International Court of Justice decision on the sovereignty of Sipadan and Ligitan islands and the independence of East Timor. No additional points were established for the area around Sipadan and Ligitan where the baselines was redrawn, while 10 new basepoints were added for the baseline to run around East Timor. Adjustments with two additional points were also made for the southern Java coast.

History
Indonesia's first piece of legislation pertaining to baselines and territorial waters was its Act No. 4 of 1960 which was decreed on 18 February 1960. The act established the country's baselines based on the "archipelago theory" which was not recognized by international law at that time. The baselines consisted of straight lines joining 201 basepoints at the edge of the archipelago.

In 1996, Indonesia enacted Law No 6 on the Indonesian Territorial Waters using the principles embodied in the UNCLOS 1982 which Indonesia ratified in 1985. The new law revoked the baselines established by the 1960 act and enabled a new set of baselines to be drawn up through the 2002 Government Regulation.

List of basepoints

South China Sea

Celebes Sea, Philippine Sea and the Pacific Ocean

♦ Basepoints modified by 2008 Government Regulation to take into account the International Court of Justice decision on the sovereignty of Sipadan and Ligitan Islands.

Arafura and Timor Seas

♦ Additional basepoints added in 2008 to modify baselines after the independence of East Timor.

Indian Ocean

♦ Basepoints added in 2008.

Straits of Malacca

See also
 Exclusive economic zone of Indonesia

References

Borders of Indonesia